Folda is a hamlet in Glen Isla, Angus, Scotland. It is situated on the River Isla, twelve miles north-west of Kirriemuir and eleven miles north of Blairgowrie, on the B951 road.

References

Villages in Angus, Scotland